The Industrial Conciliation Act, 1956 (Act No. 28 of 1956; subsequently renamed the Labour Relations Act, 1956), formed part of the apartheid system of racial segregation in South Africa. It prohibited the registration of any new 'mixed' unions and imposed racially separate branches and all-white executive committees on existing 'mixed' unions. It prohibited strikes in 'essential industries' for both black and white workers and banned political affiliations for unions. Clause 77 legalized the reservation of skilled jobs to white workers, as the Bantu Building Workers Act of 1951 had done in the construction trade, 'to ensure that they will not be exploited by the lower standard of living of any other race'.

The primary objective of the Industrial Conciliation Act was to separate the trade-union movements along racial lines, with the aim of weakening them. The Act ended recognition of trade unions with white, Coloured and Indian membership. This specified that trade unions with mixed membership had to cater exclusively for one racial group or split up into exclusive racial sections, each under the guidance of a white-controlled executive. At this time, Africans had not yet been granted permission to belong to a registered union. The Act also gave additional powers to the minister to announce strikes illegal in essential industries. Whites are thought to have benefited from this Act because the Act gave legal force to white job reservation practices.

The amendments introduced by the Industrial Conciliation Amendment Act, 1979, attempted to control African trade unions by incorporating them into the industrial-relations machinery. They could apply for registration and then, if recognised by employers could establish a checkoff system to collect subscriptions and negotiate wage agreements.  Government employees were excluded from the scope of the Act, and trade unions were not allowed to have any connection with a political party.

Repeal
The act was repealed by the Labour Relations Act No 66 of 1995.

References

Industrial Conciliation Act

1956 in South African law
Apartheid laws in South Africa